Sam Pancake (born May 10, 1964) is an American actor, improviser, writer, and comedian. He began his career with small roles in TV and film, such as Wings in 1990 and Pizza Man in 1991.

Early life 
Sam Pancake was raised in Romney, West Virginia, with siblings Chet Pancake, an American filmmaker, and Ann Pancake, an American novelist. Sam is also a distant relative of Breece D'J Pancake. Sam's father, Joe S. Pancake, was a Presbyterian minister, and later in life, a social worker. His mother, Robin Pancake, was a high-school teacher. Both parents attended university, and encouraged their children to pursue the arts, which Sam's sister Ann Pancake credits to the siblings' creativity.

Education 
Pancake graduated from Hampshire High School in West Virginia and graduated cum laude with a bachelor of fine arts in theater from West Virginia University in 1990. After graduation, Pancake moved to Los Angeles, where he still resides.

Career 
Sam Pancake was 26 when made his first on-screen appearance in the TV show Wings in 1990. Pancake has appeared as Alfie Copper in Where The Bears Are and James Alan Spangler in Arrested Development (between 2003 and 2004). He hosts his own show, Monday Afternoon Movie, a weekly podcast focusing on a different 1970's TV movie each week.

Filmography

Personal life 
Pancake is gay and notes that he most often portrays gay characters in films and television series. Pancake is single and had at least one previous relationship which was unknown to the media. He has no children.

References

External links
 

Living people
Male actors from West Virginia
American male film actors
American male television actors
American gay actors
People from Romney, West Virginia
West Virginia University alumni
1964 births